Gagananga Yukala, the Prince Bijitprijakara was a prince of Siam (later Thailand). He was a member of Siamese royal family and was a son of King Mongkut and  Phueng Indravimala

Life 
Prince Gangananga Yukala was born on 29 October 1855 in Bangkok Siam (later Thailand) is a son of King Mongkut and Phueng Indravimala.
He served as the second Minister of Justice of Siam from 1894 to 1896.
Prince Gangananga Yukala died  on 13 March 1909 at the age 53.

Thai royal demoration 
  Knight Grand Cordon with Chain of the Order of the Royal House of Chakri
  The Ancient and Auspicious of Order of the Nine Gems
  Knight Grand Cross (First Class) of The Most Illustrious Order of Chula Chom Klao
  King Rama IV Royal Cypher Medal (First Class)
  Chakrabarti Mala Medal (ร.จ.พ.)

References 

 
Thai male Phra Ong Chao
1855 births
1909 deaths
Presidents of the Supreme Court of Thailand
Ministers of Justice of Thailand
Children of Mongkut
19th-century Chakri dynasty
20th-century Chakri dynasty
Sons of kings